Kathryn Winslow (born 1973) is a Canadian actress. She is most noted as a two-time Gemini Award nominee, receiving nods for Best Supporting Actress in a Drama Series at the 21st Gemini Awards in 2006 for her role as crown attorney Pamela Menon in This Is Wonderland, and Best Supporting Actress in a Comedy Series at the 26th Gemini Awards in 2011 for her role as Bridget in Living in Your Car.

Filmography

Film

Television

References

External links

1973 births
Living people
20th-century Canadian actresses
21st-century Canadian actresses
Canadian film actresses
Canadian stage actresses
Canadian television actresses